Pobalscoil Neasáin, known as "PSN" or "Nessan's", is a co-educational and inter-denominational secondary (community) school, teaching through English, situated between Baldoyle and Bayside, in the northern suburbs of Dublin, Ireland. The school was founded in 1980, and its motto is "Meas, Díograis, agus Dea-chroí" (respect, enthusiasm, and good heart).

Academic programme
Before the beginning of the new school year in 2020, students generally had one forty-minute class of English, Irish and maths every day. History, Geography, Religion, CSPE (Civic, Social and Political Education) and SPHE (social, personal and health education) were generally done in single-period classes, spread throughout the week. Some other subjects, such as science, PE and the practical subjects such as art, often had double periods. Due to the COVID19 pandemic, class-length was increased to 60 minutes, while the number of classes a day was decreased to six as opposed to the previous nine per day.

Extra-curricular activities

Young Scientist competition
The school participates yearly in the Young Scientist competition and has received at least one merit award.

Sport
The school's Under-18 association football (soccer) team has won a number of competitions, and the Under-19 girls basketball team has won the Dublin Divisional Girls Basketball Final. The Under-14 Boys rugby union team won a rugby final in 2007.

Debating and public speaking
The school has a debating group, and in 2008 won the All Ireland Secondary Schools Debating competition. Pobalscoil Neasáin has also won several trophies and titles in public speaking, including the 2011 North Dublin Rotary Club Transition year public speaking competition.

Notable alumni
 Cecelia Ahern, novelist, works include PS, I Love You
 Robbie Brady, soccer player with Norwich City and the Republic of Ireland national football team
 Nicky Byrne, member of "boy band" Westlife

References

Secondary schools in Fingal
Community schools in the Republic of Ireland
Baldoyle
Bayside